"Friday 13th" is a song by British virtual band Gorillaz featuring French-British rapper Octavian. The track was released on 9 June 2020 as the fifth single for Gorillaz' seventh studio album, Song Machine, Season One: Strange Timez, and the fourth episode of the Song Machine project, a web series involving the ongoing release of various new Gorillaz singles and music videos featuring different guest musicians over the course of 2020.

Music video
The video, directed by Jamie Hewlett, Tim McCourt, and Max Taylor, was recorded while Gorillaz' virtual members were in quarantine due to the COVID-19 pandemic and features their likenesses, which are noticeably scarred and bruised which Jamie Hewlett stated was the result of their fight in the music video for "Aries", as well as footage of Octavian performing the track set against footage of moving roads and tunnels. The video ends with a quote from playwright James Baldwin.

Tracklist

Personnel
Gorillaz
 Damon Albarn – vocals, instrumentation, director, bass, keyboards, guitar
 Jamie Hewlett – artwork, character design, video direction
 Remi Kabaka Jr. – drum programming

Additional musicians and personnel
 Octavian – vocals
 John Davis – mastering engineer
 Samuel Egglenton – engineering 
 Stephen Sedgwick – mixing engineer, engineering

References

2020 songs
2020 singles
Gorillaz songs
Songs written by Damon Albarn
Parlophone singles
Warner Records singles
Songs written by Remi Kabaka Jr.
Neo soul songs
Downtempo songs
2020s ballads
Song Machine